KRWS-LP (100.7 FM) is a radio station licensed to Hardin, Montana, United States. The station is currently owned by Greater Hardin Association.

The station broadcasts local high school sports for Hardin.

References

External links
 

Low-power FM radio stations in Montana
Radio stations in Montana